Anthony Barbar (born 18 November 1992) is a Lebanese swimmer. He competed in the men's 50m freestyle event at the 2016 Summer Olympics where he ranked 50th.

2016 Summer Olympics

References

External links
 

1992 births
Living people
Lebanese male swimmers
Olympic swimmers of Lebanon
Swimmers at the 2016 Summer Olympics
Place of birth missing (living people)
Swimmers at the 2014 Asian Games
Swimmers at the 2018 Mediterranean Games
Swimmers at the 2018 Asian Games
Asian Games competitors for Lebanon
Mediterranean Games competitors for Lebanon